Set Me Free is a 2014 South Korean autobiographical coming-of-age film directed by Kim Tae-yong. Choi Woo-shik won Actor of the Year at the 19th Busan International Film Festival, where the film also received the Citizen Critics' Award. Set Me Free was released in theaters on November 13, 2014, and drew 23,979 admissions.

Plot
Yeong-jae grew up at Isaac's Home, a group home where he was entrusted as a child by his immature and reckless father. Now a sixteen-year-old high school student, he is told that he is now too old to remain at the group home. Yeong-jae will do anything than return to his father, so to extend his stay, he lies that he wants to become a priest and enter a Catholic boarding school. In fact, Yeong-jae doesn't believe in God, having learned to rely only on himself, and even secretly steals then resells donated goods. To show his religious faith, he attends mass regularly while fawning over the facility director and curate. Beom-tae, Yeong-jae's only friend at the home, disapproves of this insincerity, but he also understands since he himself has reached the home's maximum age. Having found nowhere else to go, Yeong-jae gets so desperate to stay that in the face of the director's growing suspicion of him, Yeong-jae turns his back on Beom-tae. Then one day, his father visits the group home, this time to leave his younger brother Min-jae there, and Yeong-jae's rage and despair reaches its breaking point.

Cast
Choi Woo-shik as Yeong-jae
Kim Su-hyeon as Chang-won
Jang Yoo-sang as Min-jae
Kang Shin-chul as Director
Shin Jae-ha as Beom-tae
Park Joo-hee as Yoon-mi
Lee Min-ah as Chang-won's mother-in-law
Park Keun-rok as Curate
Park Myung-shin as Yoon-mi's mother
Kim Jae-hwa as Yeong-jae's mother
Seo Gil-ja as Yeong-jae's aunt
Yang Ik-june as Beom-tae's father
Yoon Seung-hoon as Homeroom teacher
Bang Eun-jung as Choir member
Lee Jae-joon as Preacher

Awards and nominations

References

External links

2010s coming-of-age drama films
South Korean coming-of-age drama films
2014 films
2010s South Korean films
2010s Korean-language films